RoboCop 2 is a 1990 American science fiction film directed by Irvin Kershner and written by Frank Miller and Walon Green. It stars Peter Weller, Nancy Allen, Dan O'Herlihy, Belinda Bauer, Tom Noonan and Gabriel Damon. It is the sequel to the 1987 film RoboCop, the second entry in the RoboCop franchise, the last to feature Weller as RoboCop, and the last film Kershner directed before his death in 2010.

Set in a dystopian Detroit, the plot follows RoboCop (Weller) as he becomes embroiled in a scheme made by Omni Consumer Products to bankrupt and take over the city while also fighting the spread of a street drug and its gang of dealers led by Cain (Noonan). The film was shot on-location in Houston.

While receiving mixed reviews, the film received attention in 2013 from news media due to its plot predicting Detroit filing for bankruptcy in the future. It was nominated for three Saturn Awards, including Best Science Fiction Film, Best Performance by a Younger Actor (for Damon), and Best Special Effects (for Phil Tippett, Rob Bottin, and Peter Kuran). A sequel, RoboCop 3, was released in 1993.

Plot
In a near dystopian future, Detroit is close to bankruptcy after failing to pay off its debts to conglomerate Omni Consumer Products (OCP). The OCP chairman intends to have the city default on its debt, then foreclose on all public property, effectively taking over its government and allowing for OCP's on-going, radical urban-redevelopment plan (as established in the first film). To rally public opinion behind the project, OCP sparks an increase in street crime by terminating the privatized Detroit Police Department's pension plans and cutting salaries, triggering a police strike.

RoboCop remains on duty with his partner, Anne Lewis. They raid a manufacturing plant of Nuke, a new designer drug plaguing Detroit. The cartel's leader Cain and his prepubescent accomplice Hob escape. RoboCop has flashbacks to his previous life as Alex Murphy, and has begun watching his wife and son outside their new home. Still grieving over the death of her husband, his wife brings litigation against OCP, complaining of harassment. After his handlers dress him down, RoboCop tells his wife that Murphy is dead and he does not know her.

OCP struggles to develop RoboCop 2, a police droid fitted with the brains of legally-dead police officers, intended for mass production to replace the striking police force. The resurrected cops keep committing suicide upon activation. Morally-warped psychologist Dr. Juliette Faxx theorizes that Murphy's strong moral code and strict Catholic upbringing were critical in his initial success; she convinces the Chairman to let her lead the project to recover their 90-million dollar research and development investment. The research staff are later horrified to learn that she seeks to use death row inmates, who desire power and immortality, rather than police officers.

Cain fears losing his grip after the Delta City project, and uses corrupt police officer Duffy to undermine OCP and RoboCop's enforcement efforts. RoboCop tracks down Duffy and violently confronts him, revealing Cain's hideout. He confronts Cain's gang at an abandoned construction site, but he walks into a trap and is overwhelmed. The criminals cut apart RoboCop's body and dump the pieces in front of his precinct. Cain has Duffy vivisected for revealing their location and encourages Hob to watch.

RoboCop is repaired, but Faxx intentionally reprograms him with new and softer directives with the approval of the OCP Board of Directors that severely impede his ability to perform his duties so that her project can be selected. RoboCop eventually clears these by shocking himself with a high voltage transformer and rebooting his system. Murphy motivates the striking officers to aid him in raiding Cain's hideout. As Cain tries to escape, RoboCop wounds and apprehends him. Hob escapes and takes control of Cain's drug empire. Believing she can control Cain via his Nuke addiction, Faxx selects him for the RoboCop 2 project and disconnects his life support. Surgeons place his brain in a heavily armed robotic body, similar to ED-209, and reactivate him.

After failing to pay the city's debts via voluntary fundraising, the Mayor is contacted by Hob, who offers to retire the city's entire debt in exchange for a "hands off" policy towards Nuke, thereby nullifying OCP's scheme and preventing Delta City's construction. Threatened by this move, OCP sends Cain to the meeting. Cain slaughters everyone but the mayor, who escapes. RoboCop arrives to find a wounded Hob, who identifies the attacker before dying.

The chairman presents an unveiling ceremony for Cain and Delta City, their redevelopment plan. When he presents a canister of Nuke, Cain's uncontrollable addiction causes him to disobey his programming and murder many civilians and police officers. RoboCop arrives and fights Cain, and their battle extends to the street. RoboCop recovers the Nuke canister and Lewis uses it to distract Cain. RoboCop leaps onto his back, shoots through his armor, rips out his brain and smashes it onto the ground, ending Cain's rampage. The Chairman and Johnson decide to use Dr. Faxx as the scapegoat for Cain's attack. As Lewis complains that OCP is going to avoid accountability again, RoboCop insists they must be patient because "we're only human".

Cast

Production

1987–1988: The Corporate Wars 

RoboCop screenwriters Edward Neumeier and Michael Miner started drafting a sequel in September 1987 per strong demand by Orion which imposed a deadline of December 31, 1987. Neumeir and Miner rushed the screenplay as they were also simultaneously writing for another Orion project, Company Man; a film about the Central Intelligence Agency's involvement in the Contras, it was planned to be directed by Oliver Stone, star Paul Newman, and released before the next United States election.

Neumeier and Miner's draft, RoboCop 2: The Corporate Wars, is set 25 years after RoboCop, trying to stop a bank-robbery, is blown up by a thief. The titular protagonist wakes up in a new United States named AmeriPlex, consisting of upper-class "plexes" made out of former cities (i.e. NewYorkPlex, RioPlex, DelhiPlex) and many more shantytowns with residents named OutPlexers. He is revived in a now-abandoned building for the defunct Omni-Consumer Products by two goons of a "super-entrepreneur" named Ted Flicker, who plans to make the national government a private corporate entity he owns. Flicker also currently has a lot of control over the country, despite another person (who was a former comedian) being the president. RoboCop's new system is also the central computer system of AmeriPlex, NeuroBrain.

RoboCop 2 follows numerous subplots, such as Flicker's plan for domination, a violence-spreading narcotic named Smudge, the Internal Grid Security commander trying to commit genocide against the OutPlexers, and RoboCop's code being played with by an American scientist and a Chinese hacker. The script expands upon the first film's consumerist aspects; those in the high-class city plexes eat at LeisureGold where ServiceDroids serve them and make love with SexBots at various brothels; while the environment's media landscape is filled with "NewsBlips," mood-enhancing drugs ads, and MoonDog, a rapper from space, changing public opinion.

On March 7, 1988, a five-month Writers Guild of America strike began and its length resulted in Neumeier and Miner being fired from the project for breach of contract. Additionally, the writers and Orion struggled to agree on a story, with the studio turned off by the gritty parts of Neumeier and Miner's draft. Stone also stopped Company Man to work on Talk Radio (1988), making Neumeier and Miner no longer involved at Orion.

1988–1989: Frank Miller's RoboCop 2 

In order for a sequel to still be possible, Orion had to sign a waiver to develop other RoboCop scripts, and, before he was fired, Neumeier recommended two popular comic book authors and artists to write them: Alan Moore and Frank Miller. Although Moore rejected the offer under the reason of "I don't do movies," Miller accepted and started writing his own script, which went through four drafts. Davison hired Miller through his company Tobor Pictures initially to write RoboCop 3, only for the comic book author to write RoboCop 2 after Miner and Neumeier's firing. Miller, a year before the original film's release, became popular for his edgy, "tragic hero" take on the Batman character, a style also suited for RoboCop.

Though there are no reports of Miller taking influence from The Corporate Wars, both drafts share multiple traits: they begin their plots during the holiday season, follow a battle between corporations and poor citizens, depict an entrepreneur trying to buy governments (for Miller's screenplay, a city's government instead of a country's), have Asian hackers as RoboCop's sidekick (in Miller's case, a Japanese teenager named Keiko McFarland), and have a violence-causing drug selling throughout society.

Miller's first draft was less comic and had a bigger emphasis on corporate fascism than the final film, with the last showdown pitting RoboCop against OCP forces instead of RoboCop 2. It was enjoyed by Davison for its grittiness, "inventive action," humor, and politics; however, Orion rejected it as "unfilmable" and brought in a screenwriter of the violent western film The Wild Bunch (1969), Walon Green, to re-write it. Cut material included backstories for Anne Lewis and the marriage between Alex Murphy and his wife Ellen. Miller later used his treatment as the story of his own series of RoboCop comics published in the 2000s.

Development 
RoboCop (1987) producer Jon Davison was skeptical about doing a sequel to RoboCop. He had a negative opinion on sequel films, finding most of them worse than their predecessors and disliking not being able to make a different movie in order to produce another product audiences of the first film were used to.  Additionally, he was in a dilemma between producing a second RoboCop film and Warren Beatty's screen adaptation of the Dick Tracy comics; he chose to do RoboCop 2, as "RoboCop is my movie and Dick Tracy is more Warren's movie". Paul Verhoeven did not return as he was working on Total Recall (1990). As with the first film, multiple directors rejected offers from Davison to direct RoboCop 2, although for different reasons; Davison reported potentials either concerned about following up Verhoeven's directing or not wanting to direct a sequel film. Alex Cox, for one week, was interested in the project, only to have a viewing of the sequel to The Exorcist (1973) change his decision.

Davison first hired his friend Tim Hunter, most known for River's Edge (1986), to direct RoboCop 2, citing his "realistic tone with actors" and "real dark sensibility" as reasons. However, Hunter's vision of an entirely dark product like the first film was at odds with Miller's intention of a dark yet humorous film, leading to a tonally unfocused script by June 1989, 11 weeks before filming started and when Hunter left the project. He was replaced by Irvin Kershner, who previously experienced taking over the director's chair in a film series with the Star Wars sequel The Empire Strikes Back (1980). Kershner luckily had the same goals as Miller, but Davison, earlier in development, made a requirement for a replacement director to not change the screenplay once shooting started; however, given the very close deadline to begin filming and the messy state of the script, Kershner had no choice but to work with Miller during filming, as well as editing, to tidy up the screenplay. Miller rejected other work offers to do this. Kershner's biggest addition was dialogue, as it was part of Miller's writing to be sparse with it; and he also threw out additional scenes written by Green for reasons of Kershner and Miller already re-working the script.

Orion Pictures was far more dictatorial with RoboCop 2 than the 1987 first film, strongly going against input from Miller, Kershner, and the actors; and scheduling a release date before the story was completed, resulting in a rushed production. Neumeier and Miner reported this activity going on, claiming Orion controlled the material based on business decisions rather than creativity. According to Weller, the film did not have a proper third act as Orion thought "the monster's going to be enough." The planned released date was originally Christmas 1989 before being moved to an early summer date.

Casting 
Initially, Orion was skeptical of casting Weller, under the reasoning that the audience would find RoboCop the same if another actor was under the helmet, similar to the titular character of Universal's The Mummy. Weller himself was also skeptical coming back; he disliked Neumeier and Miner's draft as a "cartoon" and lacking in tension, felt not "complete with the character" thinking "there was something else to say with it," and wondered if he should do months of training for acting in a RoboCop suit or get paid for filming in the Caribbean for ten weeks. Ultimately, Weller returned for Miller and Green's new screenplay, and the fact that he would again work with mime Moni Yakim, who developed RoboCop movements for Weller in the first film; he praised him as the "magic element" to solve all of a crew's problems. Additionally, Russell Towery returned as Weller's stunt double, with Weller more dependent on him than the first movie.

Allen, despite already having played a cop character in the first RoboCop, still made preparations for shooting RoboCop 2; she learned martial arts and spent two months of training at a Los Angeles police academy. Although Cain was originally planned to be a typical professionally-suited drug dealer, his actor, Tom Noonan, came up with the character being a former hippie, with the actor using his experience as one in the 1960s.

Filming 
RoboCop 2 was chiefly filmed in Houston. Kershner mentioned that Houston was an ideal location due to the relative calmness of Downtown Houston at night. He also claimed that they were shooting in winter, and snow and rain would be an inappropriate climate for film production. Jefferson Davis Hospital was used as the location for the Nuke manufacturing plant. The finale of the film was shot in the Houston Theater District near Wortham Theater Center and Alley Theatre. Cullen Center was depicted as the headquarters of Omni Consumer Products, while Houston City Hall was shown in a scene in which Mayor Kuzak speaks to the press. The George R. Brown Convention Center and the Bank of America Center were also included in the film. Additional footage was filmed at the decommissioned Hiram Clarke Power Plant.

With Kershner's first few weeks spent storyboarding the visual effects during pre-production, the first month of filming RoboCop 2 were for night filming and Vistavision-camera background plates for Phil Tippett's animated special effects of the final battle scenes. A week spent filming a major sequence at an abandoned steel mill established how Kershner would direct the film's other scenes in terms of acting, lighting, and camera movements.

The second unit was directed by Conrad Palmisano and mostly shot in Los Angeles, although a stunt sequence by the unit was reported to be filmed near the entrance of the Wortham Theater Center. it got so busy it was unable to produce all the shots Kershner wanted; this meant the director had to film at the unit for a few weeks.

A magazine article published at the time of filming described the environment on set as "hell on earth," with the cast and crew rebelling against Kershner's "obsessive finickyness" and "costly reshoots." However, this was debunked by Weller who said, "Kersh didn't delay anything, he's very, very instinctive - he had his mind made up, usually ahead of time." Kershner said "I didn't shoot a lot of film at all. You see, if I'd tried to do a lot of coverage, I would never have finished. I would have been 120 days. I had to pretty much lock it in, piece by piece by piece, giving myself an out here and there, a variation, so I wasn't totally locked in. That way, I could finish. If I didn't do that, this would have gone on forever. I never would have gotten each day's work done."

Although, at the time, Allen praised Kershner for his creativeness and attention to detail, she later criticized the director as antagonistic and ruining the humor and "heart" of the screenplay. Peter Weller was also critical of the script: "RoboCop 2 didn't have a third act. I told the producers and Irv Kershner up front, and Frank Miller. I told them all. I said, 'Where's the third act here, man? So I beat up a big monster. In the third act, you have to have your Dan O'Herlihy. Somebody's got to be the third act.' 'No, no, the monster's going to be enough.' 'Look, it's not enough!'" Despite the script problem, he enjoyed working on the movie with Kershner: "I had a good time making RoboCop 2 but the script did not have the code, the spine, or the soul of the first one." Noonan also claimed to be "relaxed" and enjoying himself on set, where "everyone was incredibly nice," and found Kershner able to adapt with many location and script changes during shooting.

Effects 
Phil Tippett returned from the first RoboCop to do the visual effects for the sequel, this time leading all the effects units. RoboCop 2 was Tippett and Kershner's second collaboration, after Tippett worked at Industrial Light & Magic for The Empire Strikes Back.

Most of the RoboCop 2 design was done while Hunter was signed as director.

RoboCop suit designer Rob Bottin, although not overseeing the process like in the first film, returned to produce a new suit for the second film. The first suit was dark chrome using metal flake and various green, purple, and gold colors to create a look made iridescent and steel-like by Jost Vacano's fluorescent lighting; however, since Mark Irwin replaced Vacano for cinematographer and used conventional lighting, the second film suit (although using a black base like the other suit) looked light-bluer, so iridescent colors were more directly applied with powder. Thanks to a bigger budget, the effects team had more time to paint and polish the suit, which led to Bottin's desired "show car" look he couldn't achieve in the first. With a lot of planning and fastener hunting, Bottin also built all parts of the suit to come on and off quickly so that it couldn't decay from the actor having it on too long, which was the case of the first film.

Stop-motion and computer animation was used for the final showdown between the RoboCop and RoboCop 2 characters.

Music

The film score was composed and conducted by Leonard Rosenman, who did not use any of Basil Poledouris's themes from the first film, instead composing entirely new themes and leitmotifs. The soundtrack album was released by Varèse Sarabande.

The glam metal group Babylon A.D. released a song called "The Kid Goes Wild", written by members Derek Davis, Vic Pepe, and Jack Ponti. The song is played in the background in the middle part of the film, and it was also used to promote the film. The group created a music video featuring RoboCop targeting the band and having a shootout with some bad guys (footage of the film was also used).

Release

Marketing
To promote the film, RoboCop made a guest appearance at WCW's pay-per-view event Capital Combat, where he rescued Sting from The Four Horsemen.

Home media
The film was first released to VHS on December 13, 1990, and was later released to DVD in 1998. The film first received a Blu-ray release in 2011. VHS copies of RoboCop 2 began with an anti-drug PSA starring an out-of-character Weller that announced the Boys & Girls Clubs of America were where there was "no pot, no pills, no crack, no smack, no coke — no exceptions."

Reception

Box office
RoboCop 2 debuted as the second-highest-grossing film at the box office in its opening weekend. It went on to gross $45.7 million at the U.S. box office and additional $22,505,000 from video rentals.

Critical response

RoboCop 2 received mixed reviews from critics. While the special effects and action sequences are widely praised, a common complaint was that the film did not focus enough on RoboCop and his partner Lewis and that the film's human story of the man trapped inside the machine was ultimately lost within a sea of violence.

In his Chicago Sun Times review, Roger Ebert wrote: "Cain's sidekicks include a violent, foul-mouthed young boy named Hob, who looks to be about 12 years old but kills people without remorse, swears like Eddie Murphy, and eventually takes over the drug business... The movie's screenplay is a confusion of half-baked and unfinished ideas... the use of that killer child is beneath contempt."

The film "reset" RoboCop's character by turning him back into the monotone-voiced peacekeeper seen early in the first film, despite his reclaiming his human identity and personality by the end of that film. Many were also critical of the child villain Hob; David Nusair of Reel Film Reviews stated, "That the film asks us to swallow a moment late in the story that features Robo taking pity on an injured Hob is heavy-handed and ridiculous (we should probably be thankful the screenwriters didn't have RoboCop say something like, 'Look at what these vile drugs have done to this innocent boy')."

Janet Maslin of The New York Times wrote, "Unlike RoboCop, a clever and original science-fiction film with a genuinely tragic vision of its central character, Robocop 2 doesn't bother to do anything new. It freely borrows the situation, characters and moral questions posed by the first film." She further adds, "The difference between Robocop and its sequel, [...] is the difference between an idea and an afterthought." She also expressed her opinion about the Hob character, "The aimlessness of Robocop 2 runs so deep that after exploiting the inherent shock value of such an innocent-looking killer, the film tries to capitalize on his youth by also giving him a tearful deathbed scene." Variety wrote: "This ultraviolent, nihilistic sequel has enough technical dazzle to impress hardware fans, but obviously no one in the Orion front office told filmmakers that less is more." Peter Rainer of the Los Angeles Times panned the film.

Jay Scott, of The Globe and Mail, was one of the few prominent critics who admired the film calling it a "sleek and clever sequel. For fans of violent but clever action films, RoboCop 2 may be the sultry season's best bet: you get the gore of Total Recall and the satiric smarts of Gremlins 2: The New Batch in one high-tech package held together by modest B-movie strings. RoboCop 2 alludes to classics of horror and science-fiction (Frankenstein, Metropolis, Westworld), for sure, but it also evokes less rarefied examples of the same genres–Forbidden Planet, Godzilla, and that Z-movie about Hitler's brain in a bottle. It's ironic that the directorial coach of the first RoboCop, Paul Verhoeven, went on to Total Recall; couldn't he see that the script for Robo 2 was sleeker and swifter than Arnie's cumbersome vehicle? His absence in the driver's seat is happily unnoticed because Irvin Kershner, the engineer of sequels that often zip qualitatively past the originals (The Empire Strikes Back, The Return of a Man Called Horse, and the best Sean Connery–James Bond of all, Never Say Never Again), has tuned-up the premise until it purrs."

Review aggregation website Rotten Tomatoes retrospectively collected 39 reviews to give the film a score of 28%, with an average rating of 4.70/10. The site's consensus reads, "A less satisfying rehash that generally lives down to the negative stereotype of sequels, Robocop 2 tries to deliver more of everything and ends up with less". On Metacritic the film has a score of 42 based on reviews from 22 critics, indicating "mixed or average reviews". Audiences surveyed by CinemaScore gave the film a grade B− on scale of A to F.

The plot element of Detroit's bankruptcy received attention from the news media after this actually happened in 2013.

Thematic analysis 
Bryan Kristopowitz described RoboCop 2 as a parody of its predecessor.

Politics and corporations 
Kershner took the offer to direct RoboCop 2. RoboCop 2 continues the first film's critiques on American capitalism, corporate power and its resulting militarization and other perceived negative impacts; the city's greedy politics continue to benefit only a few, while other citizens have to face problems of crime, pollution, and infrastructure dilapidation due to inadequate restructuring and police strikes. Unlike the predecessor which had a self-aware tone and was hopeful the human race would last due to its rebelliousness, RoboCop 2s take on the corporate and political system is cynical, and more in the forefront of the story, with more staff of Omni-Consumer Products (including its CEO) becoming antagonists. It also includes a few humorous pokes at bleeding-heart liberalism, such as OCP recoding RoboCop into an environmentalist role model.

The creation of a second RoboCop to repeat the success of the original cyborg can be interpreted as a take on companies making their older products quickly out-of-date in order to keep selling new ones, and RoboCop 2's uncontrolled murdering of humans showcases how corporate entities devalue human life to a variable in an equation. More mock advertisements are seen, such as the MagnaVolt security system that electrocutes car thieves and the Sunblock 5000, a blue-and-green skincare product which can cause skin cancer itself to prevent getting skin cancer "ever since we lost the ozone layer." Noonan's idea behind Cain being a hippie was that a love for sex and drugs and hatred for law enforcement (common aspects of hippies) were negatively impacting a 1990s' Detroit.

Humanity and masculinity 
RoboCop 2 also elaborates on Officer Murphy's remaining humanity and the tech's impact on it, another reason Kershner wanted to direct; he found the conflict a symbol on real-life society becoming programmed and "roboticized" by outside forces unconsciously. Kershner's intention with RoboCop 2 was to focus more on human depth and emotions and less on violence than the first film: "It's really the violence of the soul, the violence of human interaction that counts, and that's all there."

Weller summarized that the character, after "finding out" in the predecessor, is now "reaching out for ways to return to who he was." A scene depicts RoboCop spying on his former wife's home that brings back memories of his previous life; the camera presents from his point-of-view in these set of memories, which end with Murphy seeing his human face in a bathroom, changing his expression from a smile to frown, and match cutting back to the helmeted face of RoboCop in the police car. Fordham University social professor Maxwell Guttman suggests that while having memories don't make RoboCop more human than any other regular cyborg, the addition of unnecessary, lengthy, and conflicting directives by Dr. Juliette Faxx symbolizes how complicated human behavioral science is.

David Roche and Isabelle Schmitt-Pitiot interpreted mirror sequences in RoboCop 2 and its predecessor as showing identity problems in the hypermasculine figure, mourning the loss of a "natural" masculine identity; while the first film's sequence showcased a mixture of a fake human face and electronic parts on his head as him having a fragmented identity, the second film's memory scene showcases two separate identities, where the real human one is no longer a part of him. The re-programming of RoboCop's code and use of it for a different RoboCop also presents masculinity as changing, taking various forms, and revealing hypermasculinity to not be a good form in comparison to others.

Impact 
Serial killer Nathaniel White claimed to have found inspiration for his first murder while watching RoboCop 2: "The first girl I killed was from a 'RoboCop' movie... I seen him cut somebody's throat then take the knife and slit down the chest to the stomach and left the body in a certain position. With the first person I killed I did exactly what I saw in the movie."

Other media

Sequel

A sequel titled RoboCop 3, was released in 1993.

Novelization 
A mass market paperback novelization by Ed Naha, titled RoboCop 2: A Novel, was published by Jove Books. Marvel Comics produced a three-issue adaptation of the film by Alan Grant. Like the novelization, the comic book series includes scenes omitted from the finished movie.

Comic books

Frank Miller's original screenplay for RoboCop 2 was turned into a nine-part comic book series titled Frank Miller's RoboCop. Critical reaction to the comic adaptation of the Miller script was mixed. Ken Tucker of Entertainment Weekly gave the comic a "D" score, criticizing the "tired story" and lack of "interesting action." A recap written for the pop culture humor website I-Mockery said, "Having spent quite a lot of time with these comics over the past several days researching and writing this article, I can honestly say that it makes me want to watch the movie version of RoboCop 2 again just so I can get the bad taste out of my mouth. Or prove to myself that the movie couldn't be worse than this."

See also

 List of American films of 1990
 RoboCop 2 (video game)
 RoboCop 3

References

Citations

Works cited

External links

 
 
 
 Watch a 1990 "making-of" documentary about the production of RoboCop 2 on the Internet Archive
 Watch the Robocop 2 workprint (alternate/unfinished effects) on the Internet Archive

RoboCop (franchise)
1990 films
1990s English-language films
1990 independent films
1990s science fiction action films
1990s dystopian films
1990s superhero films
American independent films
American science fiction action films
American sequel films
American superhero films
Cyberpunk films
Cyborg films
Films about amputees
Films about child death
Films about drugs
Films about terrorism in the United States
Films adapted into comics
Films directed by Irvin Kershner
Films scored by Leonard Rosenman
Films set in Detroit
Films set in the future
Films shot in Houston
Films using stop-motion animation
Juvenile delinquency in fiction
Fictional portrayals of the Detroit Police Department
Orion Pictures films
Films with screenplays by Frank Miller (comics)
Films about brain transplants
Techno-thriller films
1990s American films